Browns Bay is a bay 1.5 miles (2.4 km) wide, entered between Thomson Point and Cape Geddes along the north coast of Laurie Island, in the South Orkney Islands. Charted in 1903 by the Scottish National Antarctic Expedition under Bruce, who named it for Robert Neal Rudmose-Brown, naturalist of the expedition.

Laurie Island
Bays of the South Orkney Islands